On the Line is a 2022 thriller film written, produced, and directed by Romuald Boulanger and starring Mel Gibson.

Plot
Los Angeles shock jock Elvis Cooney leaves his wife and daughter to go to work at KLAT during the midnight slot. He is introduced to the new intern, Dylan, on whom he plays a prank at the start of his shift. Elvis runs his radio show with Mary, his switchboard operator. After being on the air for a while, Elvis receives a call from a man named Gary, who claims to be at his house and holding his wife and daughter, Olivia and Adria, hostage. When Elvis threatens to take Gary off the air, Gary says he will kill Elvis‘s family. 

Gary proceeds to explain that Elvis was responsible for a previous switchboard operator, Lauren, taking her own life due to Elvis's attitude and crude jokes towards her. Gary gets Elvis to admit on the air that he has slept with Mary. He then tells him to go up on the roof and jump. Dylan, Mary, and studio worker Steven follow. Dylan tries to trick Gary into believing that Elvis has jumped off the roof, but a drone outside is recording everything. Elvis then hears two gunshots go off and assumes his family is dead. 

On his way out of the studio, Gary's voice comes over the speakers and says that his family is still alive and somewhere in the building with him. Elvis then realizes that Gary has been in the studio the whole time and sent him on a wild goose chase so he would have time to kill the security guard at the front, hide in the building, and rig the whole place to explode. Gary says that Elvis has 40 minutes to find him before everyone dies. Elvis and Dylan make their way through the building and try to find Gary, Olivia, and Adria. Along the way, they run into Tony, an old friend of Elvis's who has been secretly stealing computers from the building. Gary orders Elvis to kill him, but he lets him go, and they move on. 

When they are led to a false hiding place, Gary reveals that he can see them through the security cameras. Elvis leads Dylan, via a route without security cameras, to the control room where they find not Gary but Justin — a host with the time slot that Elvis wants — with a bullet in his head. Gary then reveals that he is now in the recording studio with a restrained Mary and Steven. After successfully earning ten more minutes on the clock, Elvis and Dylan make their way back to the studio via another secret route. When they reach upstairs, they see Tony hanging by the neck in the hallway.

Elvis is able to apprehend Gary with a box cutter, but Gary reveals that he is holding a dead man's switch and that Olivia and Adria are on the terrace with bomb vests strapped to their bodies. Gary then receives a call from Bruce, a member of the LAPD SWAT team, who says he is on the terrace and unable to disarm the devices. Gary then demands a trade: Olivia and Adria go free, and Dylan takes their place. 

Forced to comply, Bruce deactivates the vests with Gary's help and brings them down to the studio, reactivating them on Dylan. Gary then shoots Bruce in the head and drops the dead man's switch as everyone looks on in horror only to have nothing happen. 

Elvis and Gary then burst out laughing and embracing as everyone thought to be dead re-emerges, alive and well. It is then revealed that the whole situation was a prank played by the whole studio on Dylan, who is shocked and horrified. After Elvis explains everything, he tries to get a reaction from Dylan, who leaves in silence. Elvis and his crew chase him out the door, holding the mic out to him, and Dylan falls backward down the stairs, cracking his head open and seemingly dying on impact. 

The next morning, a distraught Elvis exits the studio and swears that he is done with radio. It is then revealed that Dylan, whose real name is Max, is a stunt worker and faked his own death as part of a prank by the whole radio station in order to celebrate Elvis's birthday, which he claimed everyone forgot. Elvis is glad to see Dylan/Max alive, and he jokingly tells his co-workers to watch out, because his revenge prank will be far worse.

Cast
Mel Gibson as Elvis
Kevin Dillon as Justin
Enrique Arce as Tony
William Moseley as Dylan
Nadia Farès as Sam Dubois
 Alia Seror O'Neill as Mary
 Paul Spera as Gary, James
 Nancy Tate as Olivia

Production
Filming began in Paris, France on June 9, 2021.

Release
In May 2022, it was announced that Saban Films acquired U.S. rights to the film, which was released in November 2022.

Reception
The film has a 23% approval rating on the review aggregator website Rotten Tomatoes based on 22 reviews.

References

External links
 

2022 thriller films
Films about radio
Films about pranks
Films about kidnapping in the United States
Films about sacrifice
Films about radio people